The Philadelphia Fire Department started operating the fireboat Independence in 2007.
The vessel cost $5 million, $4.5 million of which came from a FEMA Port Security Grant.

On September 10, 2010, both the Independence and a smaller fireboat, the Fireboat Seven, from Westville, New Jersey responded to a dock fire in Paulsboro, New Jersey.
Fireboat Seven had arrived first, and put the fire out, without assistance.  When the Independence received orders to turn around, when it was near the dock, she reversed quickly, generating a wake so large it caused fireboat seven to alide with shore-side equipment.

Westville's insurance adjuster determined that Fireboat Seven was damaged beyond repair.  After a failure to reach an out-of-court settlement, Westville sued Philadelphia.  Philadelphia countersued. On July 30, 2014, Westville initiated a lawsuit in Federal Court.  Philadelphia finally settled, on March 31, 2016, for $117,000.

See also
 Fireboats of Philadelphia

References

Fireboats of the United States